Ian James Capon (born 23 January 1977) is a Welsh cricketer.  Capon is a right-handed batsman who bowls right-arm fast-medium.  He was born at Haverfordwest, Pembrokeshire.

Capon made his Minor Counties Championship debut for Wales Minor Counties in 2003 against Cornwall.  He played 2 further Championship matches in 2003, against Shropshire and Oxfordshire.  His played a single MCCA Knockout Trophy match for the team in 2005 against Berkshire.  His only List A appearance for the team came in the 1st round of the 2004 Cheltenham & Gloucester Trophy against Denmark.  The match was held in 2003.  In the match he took a single wicket for the cost of 25 runs from 4 overs.

He previously played 2 Second XI Championship matches for the Glamorgan Second XI in 1995.

References

External links
Ian Capon at Cricinfo
Ian Capon at CricketArchive

1977 births
Living people
Sportspeople from Haverfordwest
Cricketers from Pembrokeshire
Welsh cricketers
Wales National County cricketers